Old Town Plantation is a historic plantation house located near Battleboro, Edgecombe County, North Carolina. It was built about 1742, and is a -story, frame dwelling with a gambrel roof on a brick foundation.  It features a double-shoulder Flemish bond chimney with small brick wings, and two other brick chimneys.  The house has a hall-and-parlor plan.  Also on the property is a contributing log storage house with a pyramidal roof and a board-and-batten door. The house was moved in 1983, to a new site less than one mile west of the original site.

It was listed on the National Register of Historic Places in 1972, and relisted in 1983.

References

Plantation houses in North Carolina
Houses on the National Register of Historic Places in North Carolina
Houses completed in 1742
Houses in Edgecombe County, North Carolina
National Register of Historic Places in Edgecombe County, North Carolina
1742 establishments in North Carolina